Nap Televízió is a privately-owned producer of television programmes. It makes daily television programmes for Hungarian Television, called Nap-kelte (Sunrise). The company's first programmes appeared on-screen in 1989, and have run continuously ever since. Between 1999 and 2002 its programmes were broadcast by the privately owned TV3. After its bankruptcy, they moved to ATV. On September 25, 2009, the show was also discontinued on Hungarian Television channels 1 and 2 due to lack of funds.

References 

Television production companies of Hungary
Mass media companies of Hungary
1989 establishments in Hungary
Mass media companies established in 1989
Mass media in Budapest